Philip M. Rasmussen (May 11, 1918 – April 30, 2005) was a United States Army Air Forces second lieutenant assigned to the 46th Pursuit Squadron at Wheeler Field on the island of Oahu during the Japanese attack on December 7, 1941.  He was one of the few American pilots to get into the air that day.

Rasmussen was awarded a Silver Star for his actions. He flew many later combat missions, including a bombing mission over Japan that earned him an oak leaf cluster. He stayed in the military after the war and eventually retired from the United States Air Force as a lieutenant colonel in 1965. He died in 2005 of complications from cancer and is buried in Arlington National Cemetery.

Pearl Harbor attack
On the morning of December 7, Lt. Rasmussen had awakened in his barracks, when, looking out a window in purple pajamas, he saw a group of Japanese airplanes dropping bombs on the field. He strapped his .45 caliber pistol to the outside of his pajamas and ran to get an airplane.

Most of the planes were destroyed, but Lt. Rasmussen found an unscathed P-36 Hawk and taxied it to a revetment where he had it loaded with ammunition. During a lull in the bombing, he took off with three other pilots. They received orders by radio to fly to Kaneohe Bay on the north-east side of the island.

The American pilots subsequently engaged 11 Japanese aircraft. Despite having a jammed .30 caliber gun and only limited capability with his .50 caliber gun, Lt. Rasmussen managed to shoot down a Mitsubishi A6M Zero. Several other Japanese pilots attacked, including one who apparently tried to ram him. (The Japanese pilot, Iyozo Fujita, returned to the aircraft carrier, Sōryū, and survived the war.)

Rasmussen's plane was badly damaged and fell into an uncontrolled plunge into the clouds over the mountainous terrain. After passing through the clouds at about 5,000 feet he regained control of the aircraft and returned to Wheeler Field, where he landed with no brakes, rudder, or tailwheel.  Oral accounts of the number of bullet holes in the plane vary, but most give a figure of about 500.

The opening exhibit of the World War II exhibit in the National Museum of the United States Air Force at Wright-Patterson AFB near Dayton, Ohio features a mannequin of a pajama-clad pilot climbing into a P-36 Hawk. The exhibit details Lt. Rasmussen's exploits that day and is informally titled "The Pajama Pilot."

Later life
Rasmussen remained in the service where he had several assignments in the Pacific, Europe and the Middle East.  Lieutenant Colonel Rasmussen retired in 1965 as Chief of Operations, Eglin AFB. He retired to Florida where he died in 2005. 
He is buried in Arlington National Cemetery.

Images

Notes

External links
National Museum of the United States Air Force - Fact sheet on Lt. Phillip (sic) Rasmussen and his P-36A.

Arlington National Cemetery

United States Air Force officers
United States Army Air Forces officers
United States Army Air Forces pilots of World War II
Recipients of the Silver Star
Recipients of the Distinguished Flying Cross (United States)
Recipients of the Airman's Medal
Aviators from Massachusetts
Burials at Arlington National Cemetery
Deaths from cancer in Florida
Attack on Pearl Harbor
1918 births
2005 deaths